William Edward Lenkaitis (June 30, 1946 – August 27, 2016) was an American professional football player. He was a center and guard who played fourteen professional seasons.  He played with the American Football League's San Diego Chargers in 1968 and 1969, and with the National Football League's San Diego Chargers in 1970.  He then spent eleven seasons (1971–1981) with the NFL's New England Patriots. He was a member of the New England Patriots 1970s All-Decade Team. Lenkaitis attended Penn State University, and subsequently earned his dental degree in the offseason from the University of Tennessee.  He was the Patriots' dentist for many years, both when he was playing and beyond. At the time he was the only practicing dentist in the league.

Lenkaitis died of brain cancer in 2016 and later diagnosed with chronic traumatic encephalopathy after death.

See also
Other American Football League players

References

1946 births
2016 deaths
American dentists
American football centers
American football offensive guards
New England Patriots players
Penn State Nittany Lions football players
Players of American football from Cleveland
San Diego Chargers players
University of Tennessee alumni
American Football League players
20th-century dentists